Acromyrmex lundii is a species of New World ants of the subfamily Myrmicinae of the genus Acromyrmex.  It is found in the wild naturally in southern Brazil, Paraguay, Uruguay and northern Argentina.

Subspecies
The species Acromyrmex lundii contains the following subspecies:
Acromyrmex lundii boliviensis Emery, 1905 
Acromyrmex lundii carli  Gonçalves, 1961
Acromyrmex lundii decolor  Emery, 1905
Acromyrmex lundii lundii Guérin-Méneville, 1838
Acromyrmex lundii parallelus Santschi, 1916

Synonyms 
 Acromyrmex bonariensis Gallardo, 1916
 Acromyrmex dubia Gonçalves, 1961
 Acromyrmex risii Santschi, 1925
 Myrmica lundii Guérin-Méneville, 1838

See also
List of leafcutter ants

References

External links

Acromyrmex
Hymenoptera of South America
Insects described in 1838